Don't Care may refer to:

 "Don't Care", a song by Galantis from Pharmacy, 2015
 "Don't Care", a song by Obituary from World Demise, 1994
 "Don't Care", a song by Sandra Lyng, 2014
 Don't Care High, a 1985 novel by Gordon Korman
 Don't-care term, in digital logic
 Don't-care condition, in decision tables

See also
 Don't Really Care (disambiguation)
 I Don't Care (disambiguation)
 I Don't Really Care (disambiguation)